Bjørn Marius Hegge (born 11 September 1987 in Elvran, Stjørdal) is a Norwegian jazz musician (upright bass and guitar) and composer.

Biography 
Hegge completed his studies on the Jazz program at Norwegian University of Science and Technology in Trondheim, giving the exam concert with drummer Hans Hulbækmo and pianist Oscar Grönberg in 2016. While still a student he led his band Operasjon Hegge joined by former fellow students Martin Myhre Olsen, Petter Kraft, Simon Olderskog Albertsen, and Torstein Lavik Larsen, releasing his debut album Midt På Natta (2016) on the label Particular Recordings. He also collaborated in the Kjetil Mulelid Trio, including with drummer Andreas Skår Winther, releasing the album Not Nearly Enough To Buy A House (2017), What You Thought Was Home (2019) and Who Do You Love The Most (2022) on the label Rune Grammofon.

In 2016 Hegge started his quintet Hegge joined by Jonas Kullhammar (tenor saxophone), Martin Myhre Olsen (alto and soprano saxophones), Vigleik Storaas (piano) and Håkon Mjåset Johansen (drums). They released the albumet Vi Är Ledsna Men Du Får Inte Längre Vara Barn in 2017 and was awarded the Spellemannprisen in the jazz category.

Honors 
 2017: Spellemannprisen in the category Jazz, for the album Vi Är Ledsna Men Du Får Inte Längre Vara Barn.

Discography

Solo albums 
 With Operasjon Hegge
 2016: Midt På Natta (Particular Recordings)

 With Hegge
 2017: Vi Är Ledsna Men Du Får Inte Längre Vara Barn (Particular Recordings)

Collaborations 
 With Kjetil Mulelid Trio
 2017: Not Nearly Enough To Buy A House (Rune Grammofon)
 2019: What You Thought Was Home  
 2022: Who Do You Love The Most?

References

External links 
 

Norwegian jazz composers
Norwegian jazz upright-bassists
Male double-bassists
21st-century Norwegian upright-bassists
Spellemannprisen winners
People from Stjørdal
1987 births
Living people
21st-century Norwegian male musicians